Bertolucci is an Italian surname. Notable people with the surname include:

Attilio Bertolucci (1911–2000), Italian poet and writer
Bernardo Bertolucci (1941–2018), Italian film director and screenwriter
Davide Bertolucci (born 1988), Italian footballer
Giuseppe Bertolucci (1947–2012), Italian film director and screenwriter
Paolo Bertolucci (born 1951), Italian tennis player
Sergio Bertolucci (born 1950), Italian particle physicist

Italian-language surnames